The St James's Club was a London gentlemen's club which operated between 1857 and 1978. It was founded by two leading diplomats and its members continued to be largely diplomats and authors. It was first established in Charles Street and moved to 106 Piccadilly by 1868. In the final quarter of the twentieth century many gentlemen’s clubs of London suffered from declining membership, and in 1978 the St James's Club merged with Brooks's Club and vacated its premises.

Foundation
The club was founded in 1857 by the Liberal statesman the second Earl Granville and by the Marchese d'Azeglio, Minister of Sardinia to the Court of St. James's, after a dispute at the Travellers' Club. Most members of the diplomatic corps resigned from the Travellers' and joined the new club. The club's members continued to be largely diplomats and authors, and it became the home of the Dilettanti Society.

The name St James’s Club had previously been used by William Crockford as the official name of his gambling ‘hell’ in 1823 when he acquired the lease to 50 St James's Street. In the next two years he also acquired the leases to nos. 51-53, and when he pulled these down he transferred the Club to 106 Pall Mall.  When the pioneer of photography William Fox Talbot (1800–1877) was elected in 1825 to the St James's Club it was already using the 106 Pall Mall premises, where it remained until late 1826. At about the time part of the Guards Club premises at 49 St James's Street collapsed on 9 November 1826 as a result of the rebuilding of Crockford's Club next door, Crockford evidently moved the Club out of 106 Pall Mall, as the Guards Club was able to move into it within a few weeks, and it remained there until it returned to 49 St James's Street in November 1827. (The Traveller's Club only moved from 49 Pall Mall into 106 after the old building had been pulled down in 1829 and its new premises, designed by Charles Barry, had been completed by July 1832.) Crockford's palatial premises for his St James's Club, taking up the entire site of 50-53 St James's Street, was opened in mid November 1827 and closed on 1 January 1846.

According to the Encyclopædia Britannica article Club, in 1902, the club was the smallest London gentlemen's club in terms of numbers -

Premises
The St James's Club was first established in Charles Street, just off the south corner of Berkeley Square, London. By 1868, it had moved into its clubhouse at 106 Piccadilly which had previously been Coventry House, the London residence of the Earls of Coventry since it had been bought by George Coventry, 6th Earl of Coventry from Sir Hugh Hunlocke in 1764, for 10,000 guineas. Coventry House had been built in 1761 on the site of an old public house called 'The Greyhound Inn'. The five-bay structure is neo-Palladian in style, with alternating pediments on the grand floor windows, over a rusticated ground floor. The Palladian window on the side façade lights a handsome staircase. There are ceilings by Robert Adam in rooms on the piano nobile. Thomas Cundy the Elder effected some remodelling, probably in 1810-11.

According to Charles Dickens, Jr., writing in 1879:

During the Second World War, the club was briefly the home of Ian Fleming, the creator of James Bond.

The club was described by Charles Graves, writing of London clubs in Leather Armchairs (1963), as "the only one in London, or possibly anywhere else in the world, which has a separate room – and a large one at that – devoted solely to backgammon".

The club was also well known as a London venue for chess matches.

End of the club
In the decades after the Second World War, the popularity of gentlemen's clubs of London gradually fell into decline. Facing financial problems, the club merged with Brooks's Club in 1978 and vacated its premises. The grand former club house at 106 Piccadilly later became the headquarters of The International House network of language schools, founded by John Haycraft. Since October 2007, it has been the London campus of Limkokwing University of Creative Technology, a private intercontinental university based in Malaysia. From September 2017, it will be home to Eaton Square Upper School.

The St James's Club and Hotel, opened in 2008 in Park Place, has been marketed to evoke the historic club. A St James's Club in Manchester has no connection.

Notable members
Granville Leveson-Gower, 2nd Earl Granville (1815–1891), Liberal statesman
Vittorio Emanuelle Taparelli, Marchese d'Azeglio (1816–1890), Minister of Sardinia
Sir Osbert Sitwell, 5th Baronet (1892–1969), author
Sir Sacheverell Sitwell, 6th Baronet (1897–1988), author and brother of Sir Osbert
Oliver St John Gogarty (1878–1957), Anglo-Irish author
Sir Harry Verney, 4th Baronet MP (1881–1974), politician
Victor Hay, 21st Earl of Erroll (1870–1928), diplomat
Sir Murdoch Macdonald (1866–1957), politician and engineer
Alfred Clayton Cole (1854–1920) Governor of the Bank of England
Arthur Rowley, 8th Baron Langford (1870–1953), diplomat
Major Cav. Lawrence Edward Lotito (1921–2004), business owner, meteorologist
Anatole de Grunwald (1910–1967), film producer
Lord Ivor Spencer-Churchill (1898–1956), cousin of Winston Churchill
Evelyn Waugh (1903–1966), author
Sir Osbert Lancaster, cartoonist, stage designer and author
Harold Soref, politician and businessman

See also
List of London's gentlemen's clubs

References

1857 establishments in England
1978 disestablishments in England
Gentlemen's clubs in London
Defunct clubs and societies of the United Kingdom
Defunct organisations based in London